Duarte Ferreira (born 1 November 1992 in Lisbon, Portugal) is a Portuguese-born Angolan racing driver, residing in Luanda.

He began his career in karting in Belgium. He then progressed to Formula Renault 1.6 Belgium. In 2010 he competed in Formula Three Sudamericana Lights and finished 3rd in the championship, capturing 5 class wins and 3 overall podium finishes in the series' three races at Velopark. In 2011 he raced in Firestone Indy Lights with the Bryan Herta Autosport team. Ferreira finished eighth in points with a best finish of third on the oval at New Hampshire Motor Speedway. He also recorded the fastest lap of the race at Kentucky Speedway.

In 2012, he ran limited schedules in both Indy Lights and the NASCAR K&N Pro Series East stock car series.

Indy Lights Results

References

Living people
1992 births
Sportspeople from Lisbon
Sportspeople from Luanda
Angolan racing drivers
Indy Lights drivers
Formula 3 Sudamericana drivers
NASCAR drivers

Bryan Herta Autosport drivers